Toivo Topias Pohjala (July 27, 1931 – November 12, 2018) was a Finnish agronomist and politician. He was born in Harjavalta, and is son of Toivo Pohjala. He was a member of the Parliament of Finland from 1975 to 1987. From 1987 to 1991 he served as Minister of Agriculture and Forestry.

References

1931 births
2018 deaths
Finnish politicians
People from Harjavalta